Thornhill is a suburban district in the Regional Municipality of York in Ontario, Canada, split between the City of Vaughan (its western portion) and the City of Markham (its eastern portion), with Yonge Street forming the municipal boundary. Thornhill is situated along the northern border of Toronto, centred on Yonge, and is also immediately south of the City of Richmond Hill. Once a police village, Thornhill is still a postal designation. As of 2016, its total population, including both its Vaughan and Markham sections, was 112,719.

History

Early history
Thornhill was founded in 1794.  The original boundaries were the northern bounds of the Ladies Golf Club on the east side of Yonge and further north on the west side of Yonge; southern end between John Street and Arnold Avenue/Elgin Street. Its first settlers on Yonge Street in Thornhill were Asa Johnson (who settled on the Vaughan side) and Nicholas Miller (c. 1760–1810; who settled on the Markham side). Of particular importance was the arrival of Benjamin Thorne (January 4, 1794 – July 2, 1848) in 1820 from Dorset, England, who was operating a gristmill, a sawmill, and a tannery in the community. The settlement came to be known as Thorne's Mills, and later, Thorne's Hill, from which its current name is derived. (Thorne committed suicide in 1848, after a serious wheat market crash.)

Between 1830 and 1848, Thornhill experienced a period of continued growth and prosperity.  The business district of Thornhill developed on its portion of Yonge Street, between Centre Street and John Street. Stagecoaches travelled between Holland Landing (Lake Simcoe) and York (Toronto) as Yonge Street's road conditions improved with new stonework.  During this prosperous period, several churches, many of which are still standing today, were constructed.

Thornhill's location along Yonge Street, a major transportation route, proved beneficial to the community's growth throughout much of the twentieth century. The implementation of the electric radial Metropolitan line along Yonge Street in 1898 running north to Sutton and south to Toronto meant that, for the first time, people could reside in Thornhill and work in Toronto. By the 1920s, automobiles also facilitated travel along Yonge Street.

20th and 21st centuries
In 1931, Thornhill became a "Police Village"; before that time, Thornhill had no independent status and was split between the townships of Vaughan and Markham along Yonge Street, since the creation of municipal government in 1850. Before 1931, each township administered its half of the village. The creation of the Police Village gave Thornhill its own political boundaries. The village was headed by a reeve.

In 1971, York Region was created, part of a wave of municipal re-organization which converted many townships into towns and eliminated many of the municipal forms of organization which had existed within those townships. The establishment of a regional administration effectively eliminated the Police Village of Thornhill. Thornhill's administration reverted to Markham and Vaughan, which were enlarged in territory and upgraded to Town status at this time.

However, many social institutions remained organized around the former municipal entities eliminated in 1971. Like neighbouring communities such as Woodbridge, Maple, and Unionville – and more so than was the case for historic suburban communities within the City of Toronto – community organizations such as local newspapers, and sports teams continued to operate under a Thornhill administrative structure. As an example, until the mid-1990s residents of Thornhill who wanted to play high-level hockey were required to play for a Thornhill team.

While the old village of Thornhill revolved around Yonge Street between Centre and John Streets, the neighbourhood is typically thought to be between Dufferin Street to the west, Highway 7 to the north, Steeles Avenue to the south, and Highway 404 to the east.

Suburbanization
Thornhill's growth since the 1960s and 1970s has been largely connected to its location bordering what is now the City of Toronto.

Growth has continued apace. Developments have sprung up across various areas of Thornhill in each of the municipal districts which encompass Thornhill, following the development patterns of the Greater Toronto Area.

Coyote problem
In the summer of 2020, after the emergence of the COVID-19 pandemic, the area around Hefhill Park, near Bathurst and Centre Streets, began experiencing a problem with its coyote population. As reported by the Toronto Star, Thornhill residents' "daily routines have been completely altered after a pack of coyotes living nearby appears to have lost its fear of humans". The issue exacerbated when dogs began mysteriously disappearing and a 14-year-old girl was chased by one of the coyotes.

As stated by the Toronto Star "the coyotes’ behaviour has changed [in 2020]. Before 2020 the animals were not aggressive and usually only seen by those living directly next to them. Now they are frequently spotted in people’s yards, residential streets and on major intersections, the residents said". Residents of Thornhill continue to report sightings and attacks by coyotes to their local and regional governments as the issue remains unresolved.

Demographics

Ethnicity
Thornhill has a very ethnically diverse population. It is home to a significant number of Jewish, Chinese, Korean, Iranian, Indian, and  Italian people.
According to 2001 Federal Census data, the electoral district of Thornhill (which is not entirely congruent with the neighbourhood) consists of Chinese, the largest visible minority, accounting for almost 11% of total residents (12,610), followed by South Asian (6,595), Black (2,665), Korean (2,660), Filipino (2,535), and West Asian (2,355).

According to the 2009 Report of Canada's Demographic Task Force, Thornhill-Vaughan is home to more than 33,000 members of the Jewish community.

Government
Thornhill is split into Wards 4 and 5 in the City of Vaughan and Ward 1 in the City of Markham. It is represented by Chris Ainsworth (Vaughan Ward 4), Gila Martow (Vaughan Ward 5), and Keith Irish (Markham Ward 1).

Thornhill is also a federal and provincial riding. The Member of Parliament for Thornhill is Melissa Lantsman (Conservative), and the Member of Provincial Parliament is Laura Smith (Progressive Conservative).

Infrastructure

Healthcare
There are no general hospitals in Thornhill, but a private hospital, Shouldice Hernia Centre, is located there.

Thornhill Community Centre 

Located at Bayview and John Street, the community centre features a double arena (home to the Thornhill Skating Club, Markham Majors and Islanders hockey clubs (with an east rink named for Bib Sherwood in 1999), therapy pool, gym room, running track, multi-purpose rooms and Markham Public Library branch. The complex was opened in 1975. 

Thornhill Community Centre is home to the Markham Cat Adoption Centre & Education Centre, which was launched in 2016 and is partnered with the Ontario SPCA. It was the first cat adoption and education centre in the Greater Toronto Area, and the first cat adoption centre to be municipally funded in Ontario. The centre has housing for 18 cats and provides an accessible space for education in the area. 

The Thornhill Seniors Club, also located in the community centre, was established in 2004 following expansions to the centre that began in 2003.  It features a variety of activities for seniors in a space that boasts a TV lounge with a fireplace, full kitchen, activity rooms, and more.

The community centre hosted the Markham Thunder of the Canadian Women's Hockey League from 2017 to 2019.

Thornlea Pool is a public swimming pool located further north of the community centre near Thornlea Secondary School.

Parks

 Annswell Park
 Bercy (Wycliffe) Park
 Don Valley Park
 Downham Green Park
 Edmund Seager Parkette
 Gallanough Park
 German Mills Settlers PArk
 Gilmore Park
 Grandview Park
 Hefhill Park
 Oakbank Pond Park
 Paddock Park
 Pomona Mills Park located near old grist mill and on old Brunshill Estate
 Rosedale North Park
 Royal Orchard Park
 Simonston Park
 Thornhill Park
 Vaughan Crest Park
 Wade Gate Park
 Winding Lane Park
 Woodland Park
 York Hill District Park
 Rowley Hill Park

Education

Public schools
Secondary schools

Stephen Lewis Secondary School, established in 2006
Thornhill Secondary School, established in 1955
Thornlea Secondary School, established in 1969
Hodan Nalayeh Secondary School, established in 1989 (as Vaughan Secondary School until 2021)
Westmount Collegiate Institute, established in 1996

Elementary schools

Anne Frank Public School, established in 2014
Bakersfield Public School, established in 2003
Baythorn Public School
Bayview Glen Public School
Bayview Fairways Public School
Brownridge Public School
Carrville Mills Public School, established in 2007
Charlton Public School
Doncrest Public School
E.J. Sand Public School
German Mills Public School
Glen Shields Public School
Henderson Avenue Public School
Herbert H. Carnegie Public School
Johnsview Village Public School
Julliard Public School
Louis Honoré Fréchette Public School
Roberta Bondar Public School
Royal Orchard Public School
Rosedale Heights Public School
Stornoway Crescent Public School
Thornhill Public School
Thornhill Woods Public School
Ventura Park Public School
Westminster Public School
Willowbrook Public School
Wilshire Elementary School
Woodland Public School
Yorkhill Elementary School

Catholic schools

Blessed Bishop Scalabrini Catholic Elementary School
Holy Family Catholic Elementary School, closed, currently rented to E.J. Sand Public School
St. Elizabeth Catholic High School, established in 1987
Our Lady of the Rosary
St. Joseph the Worker
St. Robert Catholic High School
St. Anthony Catholic Elementary School
St. Michael Catholic Academy
St. Luke Catholic Elementary School

Private schools

Jewish schools

Secondary:

Ner Israel Yeshiva College

Primary:

Cheder Chabad
Associated Hebrew Schools of Toronto
Eitz Chaim Day Schools
Netivot HaTorah Day School

Media
Salam Toronto – Bilingual Persian–English weekly paper

Farmer's market 

York Farmers Market has existed on Yonge Street since 1953. The farmers market is housed in a permanent building structure.

Notable people

Arts

Film and broadcasting
Hayden Christensen – Actor, most notable for playing Anakin Skywalker in the Star Wars prequel trilogy
Sidney M. Cohen – TV Director and Producer The Mad Dash and Thrill of a Lifetime & "Accessibility in Action"
Lauren Collins – Actress, notable role of Paige on Degrassi: The Next Generation
Daniel Dale – Reporter and fact-checker for CNN 
Jian Ghomeshi – musician and ex. CBC radio personality
Corey Haim – Actor, best known for roles in movies, such as Lucas, and The Lost Boys
Tajja Isen – Voice actress
Simcha Jacobovici – Known as "The Naked Archaeologist"
Hadley Kay – Voice actor
Paul McGuire – Host on CMT (Canada)
Dan Shulman – Sports broadcaster who works for ESPN
Stu Stone – Actor and voiceover performer
Daniel Magder – Actor

Literature
Gordon Korman – Author, especially of children's and young adult books

Music
Adam "Frank Dukes" Feeney – Grammy Award-winning music producer
By Divine Right – indie rock band
Gerald Eaton – R&B singer-songwriter, producer and lead singer of The Philosopher Kings
Moxy Früvous – Musical group of the 1990s whose songs featured satirical themes (included CBC personality Jian Ghomeshi)
Hayden – Folk rock musician and songwriter
hHead – alternative rock band of the 1990s
Judy & David – children's recording artists, composers, television personalities, and live concert artists
Ryan and Dan Kowarsky – Singers, members of the music group b4-4
Jon Levine – Musician, Producer – The Philosopher Kings
Anne Murray – singer – lived in one of Thornhill's oldest districts near the pond for several years
The Philosopher Kings – R&B band
Jackie Richardson – Gospel, blues and jazz singer

Visual arts
Fred S. Haines – Painter (1879–1960)
J. E. H. MacDonald – Group of Seven painter
Thoreau MacDonald – illustrator, designer and calligrapher

Sports
Bianca Andreescu, professional tennis player; 2019 US Open singles champion
Alon Badat (born 1989) - Israeli soccer player
Adrian Cann (born 1980) – Professional soccer player
Tomer Chencinski (born 1984) – Israeli-Canadian soccer player
Gillian Ferrari – Women's ice hockey player; won gold medal for Canadian women's hockey team in 2006 Winter Olympics
Alison Goring – Women's curling champion
Adam Henrich (born 1984) – Professional ice hockey player for Coventry Blaze of the Elite Ice Hockey League
Michael Henrich (born 1980) – Professional ice hockey player for Dornbirner EC in Austria
Eric Himelfarb (born 1983) – Professional ice hockey player for Linköpings HC in the Swedish Elitserien (SEL)
Joshua Ho-Sang (born 1996) – Professional ice hockey player in the New York Islanders organization
Mitch Marner – Professional hockey player for the Toronto Maple Leafs
Dominic Moore – Professional ice hockey player with the Toronto Maple Leafs
Steve Moore – Professional ice hockey player with the Colorado Avalanche until a career-ending injury
Milos Raonic (born 1990) – Professional tennis player
Paul Rosen (born 1960) – Paralympic ice hockey player; won gold medal for Canadian men's paralympic hockey team in 2006 Winter Olympics
Ben Silverman (born 1987) – Professional golfer
Andrew Wiggins (born 1995) – Professional basketball player for the Golden State Warriors of the NBA

Other personalities
Craig Kielburger – Canadian author, social entrepreneur, Creator and founder of Free the Children, child-run campaign against child labour and injustice
Marc Kielburger – Canadian author, social entrepreneur, Co Founder of WE Charity, CEO of ME to WE
Robert McGhee – Archaeologist and author specializing in the archaeology of the Arctic
Sue Rodriguez – Advocate of the right to die with dignity.  Her story was the topic of the 1998 feature film At the End of the Day: The Sue Rodriguez Story
The Bee Family – internet personalities

See also

 List of unincorporated communities in Ontario

References

External links

City Of Vaughan Official Website
City Of Markham Official Website

 
Populated places established in 1794
1794 establishments in Upper Canada
Neighbourhoods in Markham, Ontario
Neighbourhoods in Vaughan
Jewish communities in Canada
Jews and Judaism in Ontario
Orthodox Jewish communities
Orthodox Judaism in Ontario
Jewish enclaves